Jyrki Saranpää (born 30 August 1983) is a Finnish football player who plays for Veikkausliiga side Vaasan Palloseura. He is adept at playing as a striker, midfielder and defender, making him a valuable asset to his squad. He has even played as a goalkeeper and saved a penalty in that match (against Turun palloseura).

References
Veikkausliiga Hall of Fame 
TP-Seinäjoki history pages 
Saranpää saves a penalty

External links
Veikkausliiga profile 
Vaasan Palloseura profile 

Finnish footballers
Vaasan Palloseura players
Veikkausliiga players
1983 births
Living people
Lapuan Virkiä players
Association football defenders
Association football forwards
Association football midfielders
People from Seinäjoki
Sportspeople from South Ostrobothnia